Nepenthe is the second studio album from American singer-songwriter Julianna Barwick. It was released in August 2013, under Dead Oceans Records.

Track listing

References

2013 albums
Julianna Barwick albums
Dead Oceans albums